Lines of Zahn are a characteristic of thrombi. They have layers, with lighter layers of platelets and fibrin, and darker layers of red blood cells. They are more present on thrombi formed with faster blood flow, more so on thrombi from the heart and aorta. They are only seen on thrombi formed before death. They are named after German–Swiss pathologist Friedrich Wilhelm Zahn.

Definition 
Lines of Zahn are a characteristic of thrombi. They have visible and microscopic alternating layers (laminations). Platelets mixed with fibrin form lighter layers. Red blood cells form darker layers. Sometimes, the term "lines of Zahn" only refers to the lighter layers.

Evaluation 
Lines of Zahn can be used to confirm diagnosis of a thrombus. Their presence implies thrombosis at a site of rapid blood flow that happened before death. They are more common in thrombi formed in the heart or aorta. In veins or smaller arteries, where flow is not as constant, they occur less frequently. They are also only seen on thrombi formed when blood is flowing. This is a distinguishing marker between thrombi that formed before death and after death.

History 
Lines of Zahn are named after German–Swiss pathologist Friedrich Wilhelm Zahn.

Additional images

References

Further reading 

 
 

Symptoms and signs: Vascular